Freiburg railway station could refer to:

 Freiburg Hauptbahnhof in Freiburg im Breisgau, Germany
 Fribourg railway station in Fribourg, Switzerland